Rock Creek Township is a township in Cowley County, Kansas, USA.  As of the 2000 census, its population was 243.

Geography
According to the USGS, it contains three cemeteries: Brookshire, Stalter and Widener.

The streams of Durham Creek, Eightmile Creek, Muddy Creek, Myers Creek, Polecat Creek, Rock Creek, Sanford Creek, Spring Creek and Stalter Branch run through this township.

Transportation
Rock Creek Township contains one airport or landing strip, Eaton Acres Landing Strip.

References
 USGS Geographic Names Information System (GNIS)

External links
 City-Data.com

Townships in Cowley County, Kansas
Townships in Kansas